The 1928–29 season was the 52nd Scottish football season in which Dumbarton competed at national level, entering the Scottish Football League and the Scottish Cup.  In addition Dumbarton played in the Dumbartonshire Cup.

Scottish League

With just two wins from their first 11 league games, Dumbarton's hopes for promotion in their seventh successive season in the Second Division was never going to be a real possibility. In the end Dumbarton finished 14th out of 19, with 31 points - 20 behind champions Dundee United.

Scottish Cup

Dumbarton reached the third round before losing out to Raith Rovers.

Dumbartonshire Cup
Dumbarton were runners-up in the Dumbartonshire Cup for the fifth season running, again losing out to Clydebank in the final.

Player statistics

|}

Source:

Transfers

Players in

Players out 

In addition Andrew Hamill, James Laing, Thomas Lamont, Andrew Mair, William Murray, John Pearson and John Russell all played their last games in Dumbarton 'colours'.

Source:

References

Dumbarton F.C. seasons
Scottish football clubs 1928–29 season